is a passenger railway station in located in the city of Matsubara,  Osaka Prefecture, Japan, operated by the private railway operator Kintetsu Railway.

Lines
Nunose Station is served by the Minami Osaka Line, and is located 8.3 rail kilometers from the starting point of the line at Ōsaka Abenobashi Station.

Station layout
The station consists of two ground-level island platforms connected by an underground passage.

Platforms

Adjacent stations

History
Nunose Station opened on April 18, 1922.

Passenger statistics
In fiscal 2018, the station was used by an average of 5,057 passengers daily.

Surrounding area
Nunose Shrine
Nishiyoke River
Matsubara City Matsubara Third Junior High School
Matsubara City Nunoshino Elementary School

See also
List of railway stations in Japan

References

External links

 Kintetsu: Nunose Station 

Railway stations in Japan opened in 1922
Railway stations in Osaka Prefecture
Matsubara, Osaka